Christian and Missionary Alliance Sun Kei Secondary School is a Secondary School which is located in 6 Tong Chun Street, Tseung Kwan O, Hong Kong. This school is proclaimed by Christian and Missionary Alliance Hong Kong Association to organize in 1999.

The entire school has 27 classes, there are around 1000 students, and the principal is Dr. Poon Suk-han, Halina, MH.

Subjects

Secondary 1
English Language, Chinese Language, Mathematics, Integrated Science, History & Culture, Putonghua, Home Economics, Project Studies, Japanese, Computer Literacy, Religious Studies (Christianity), Visual Arts, Music, Physical Education, Life Education, Geography

Secondary 2
English Language, Chinese Language, Mathematics, Integrated Science, History & Culture, Putonghua, Liberal Studies, Project Studies, Computer Literacy, Religious Studies, Home Economics, Visual Arts, Music, Physical Education, Life Education, Geography

Secondary 3
English Language, Chinese Language, Mathematics, Physics, Chemistry, Biology, Economics, Geography, History & Culture, Putonghua, Liberal Studies, Computer Literacy, Religious Studies, Visual Arts, Music, Physical Education, Life Education

Secondary 4 - 6 
Students should learn core subjects and choose 2-3 elective subjects to learn.

Core Subjects
English Language, Chinese Language, Mathematics, Liberal Studies

Elective Subjects
Physics, Chemistry, Biology, Combined Science, Economics, BAFS, Geography, Chinese History, ICT, Tourism and Hospitality Studies, Visual Arts (S4, S6 Only), Mathematics Module 2

Others
Religious Studies, Music, Physical Education, Life Education

Spiritual Growth 
Starting from September 1999, Sun Kei Secondary School always strives for nurturing spiritual growth of students and staffs. "Trust in the Lord with all your heart and lean not on your own understanding;in all your ways submit to him, and he will make your paths straight (Proverbs 3:5-6)" is chosen to be their school motto.

Moreover, Sun Kei will hold gospel week, sermon assembly once a year to force and encourage students become an Evangelical Christian.

Transportation
MTR: Tseung Kwan O station Exit A1

External links
 Homepage of Christian and Missionary Alliance Sun Kei Secondary School

Protestant secondary schools in Hong Kong
Christian and Missionary Alliance
Educational institutions established in 1999
1999 establishments in Hong Kong